PT Global Jet Express, t/a J&T Express is an Indonesian logistics and express delivery company. Founded in 2015 (as PT Global Jet Express), the company has 350,000 employees worldwide. Since its founding, J&T experienced rapid growth, expanding into Malaysia, Vietnam, the Philippines, Thailand, Cambodia, Singapore, China, Mexico, Brazil, Saudi Arabia, the UAE and Egypt by 2022. It is one of the two decacorn companies in Indonesia. In December 2021, it was valued at USD $20 billion, and ranked as the 16th-largest unicorn globally.

History
J&T, whose Chinese name means "speedy rabbit", was founded in 2015 by entrepreneurs Jet Lee, former CEO of Oppo Indonesia, and Tony Chen, who had founded the smartphone brand in 2004.

In 2018, the company expanded into Malaysia and Vietnam; then the Philippines, Thailand and Cambodia, in 2019; Singapore and China in 2020; and the UAE, Saudi Arabia, Mexico and Egypt in 2022. It received Indonesian Top Brand Awards in 2018 and 2019.

In March 2021, the company launched J&T Express premium air freight, its first all-cargo aircraft. By November, J&T had raised an additional US$ 2.5 billion, with a valuation of US$ 20 billion and investments from Boyu Capital, Hillhouse Capital Group, Sequoia Capital China, and Tencent Holdings. Reports indicate that J&T is planning to go public in Hong Kong in 2022, and that CICC, Bank of America and Morgan Stanley are preparing its IPO. In December 2021, the company acquired the logistics operations in China of rival BEST Inc. for about 6.8 billion yuan (US$ 1.1 billion).

In early 2022, J&T expanded into Saudi Arabia and the UAE, then Latin America, with a new facility in Mexico. In February 2022, at LEAP, the company announced plans to build its MENA regional headquarters in Riyadh, Saudi Arabia, where it intends to construct the largest smart logistics industrial park in the region. That June, it expanded its network into 13 countries with the launch of J&T Express Egypt.

In 2019, J&T was the fourth-largest delivery company, and the eighth unicorn in Indonesia. As of April 2021, the company was valued by investors at US$ 8 billion. In December 2021, the company was ranked as the 16th-largest unicorn in the world on the Hurun Index. It is one of the two decacorns in Indonesia.

COVID-19 pandemic 
The COVID-19 pandemic in Indonesia resulted in a 50% increase in J&T deliveries during Ramadhan 2020, compared to the previous year, and its handling of up to three million packages each day.

J&T Express has given aid packages to cities severely affected by the outbreak, such as Surabaya and Tangerang. Medical aid packages were also given to hospitals.

Controversy
After a video went viral of workers throwing packages in 2020, J&T Express Philippines stated that it would sanction personnel involved in mishandling the packages. Similar video showing J&T Express Indonesian workers also circulated on the internet in 2019.

Media Konsumen, an Indonesian consumer complaints platform, received multiple letters addressing complaints about faulty sorting and lack of transparency and accountability in J&T Express delivery tracking, resulting in their packages being lost or sent to wrong delivery address.
 

On 4 February 2021, videos of protests and rioting at J&T Express Malaysia warehouses circulated on Malaysian social media channels. J&T subsequently issued a statement that the incident had resulted from a misunderstanding about bonus payments, and not due to a pay cut, as previously alleged online. The following week, the incident was attributed to an extra workload combined with employee payment concerns by the Ministry of Human Resources. Several workers also recorded an apology video to J&T Express and customers, stating that there are no wage issues or deductions between the company and employees of J&T Express Perak.

See also

List of unicorn startup companies

References

Logistics companies of Indonesia
Indonesian companies established in 2015
Transport companies established in 2015
Indonesian brands
Companies based in Jakarta
Transport companies of Indonesia
Privately held companies of Indonesia